Acanthocalycium rhodotrichum is a species of  Acanthocalycium found in Argentina, Bolivia, Brazil, Paraguay, and Uruguay

Subspecies
Acanthocalycium rhodotrichum subsp. chacoanum 
Acanthocalycium rhodotrichum subsp. rhodotrichum

References

External links

rhodotrichum
Flora of Argentina
Flora of Bolivia
Flora of Brazil
Flora of Uruguay
Flora of Paraguay